This is a list of states headed by the Serer Lamanes.  The Lamanes (or Lamans) have a historical, economic and religious significance in Serer countries.  The following pre-colonial kingdoms and new states (post-independence) were for a long time dominated by the Serer Lamanic class :

Kingdom of Sine
Kingdom of Saloum
Kingdom of Baol
Kingdom of Jolof
Kingdom of Waalo
Kingdom of Tekrur

Notes

Bibliography
Gravrand, Henry, "La Civilisation Sereer - Cosaan : Les origines", vol. 1, Nouvelles Editions africaines, 1983, 
Gravrand, Henry, "La civilisation Sereer, Pangool, Dakar, Nouvelles Editions Africaines (1990), 
Becker, Charles: Vestiges historiques, trémoins matériels du passé clans les pays sereer, Dakar. 1993. CNRS – ORS TO M
Sarr, Alioune, "Histoire du Sine-Saloum", Introduction, bibliographie et Notes par Charles Becker, BIFAN, Tome 46, Serie B, n° 3–4, 1986–1987, p21
Boulègue, Jean. "Le Grand Jolof, (XVIIIe – XVIe Siècle)", (Paris, Edition Façades), Karthala (1987),
Dyao, Yoro, "Légendes et coutumes sénégalaises", Cahiers de Yoro Dyao: publiés et commentés par Henri Gaden. (E. Leroux, 1912)
Galvan, Dennis Charles, "The State Must Be Our Master of Fire" : How Peasants Craft Culturally Sustainable Development in Senegal" Berkeley, University of California Press, 2004,  

Serer history
Serer country
History of Mauritania
Lamane